Anna-Mart van der Merwe (born 9 August 1963), is a South African filmmaker and actress. She is best known for the roles in the films Stuur groete aan Mannetjies Roux, Poppie Nongena, and Kanarie as well as television soapies Soul City, Binnelanders, and 7de Laan.

Personal life
van der Merwe was born on 9 August 1963 in Vredendal, South Africa. She matriculated at Vredendal High School. Then she completed her BA degree in Languages from the University of Cape Town. Then he completed a diploma in Speech and Drama at the same university and nominated for ŉ Fleur de Cap award in the Most Promising Study category.

She is married to George Ware, a Zimbabwean businessman.

Career
After graduation in 1987, she was offered a two-year contract with the then TRUK at the Windybrow Theater in Hillbrow, Johannesburg. During this period, she acted in many theatre productions: The Women of Troy, The Witches of Salem, Boo to the Moon and Sing You of Bombs. In 1989 her contract period ended and then became a freelance actress. In 0000, she made television debut with the television serial Uitdraai produced by Annie Basson. After that success, she acted in many television serials in the preceding years such as; Sonkring 1 en 2, Torings, Konings, Onder Draai die Duiwel Rond, Soul City, Amalia, Feast of the Uninvited, Binnelanders, 7de Laan and Tydelik Terminaal gevolg.

In 1992, she made her debut film with Die Storie van Klara Viljee directed by Katinka Heyns. After that she appeared in several films, such as; The Long Run, Red Dust, Hanna Hoekom, Stuur Groete aan Mannetjies Roux, Dis Koue Kos Skat. In 1994, she acted in the telenovela Soul City, where she later won the Avanti Trophy for the Best Supporting Actress - Drama Series category at the NTVA Avanti Awards. In 2009, she joined with the cast of 7de Laan and played the role "Christelle Terreblanche". For this role, she won the SAFTA Golden Horn	Best Supporting Actress - TV Soap category at the South African Film and Television Awards (SAFTA). In 2013, she starred in the film Stuur groete aan Mannetjies Roux and later won the Silwerskerm Festival Prize for Best Actress at the 2014 Silwerskerm Festival.

In 2018, she was nominated for the SAFTA Golden Horn for Best Supporting Actress in Feature Film category for the role "Arlene Louw" in the blockbuster film Kanarie directed by Christiaan Olwagen. In 2019, she acted in the film Poppie Nongena and played the role "Antoinette Swanepoel". At the Silwerskerm Festival, van der Merwe along with film crew won the Best Ensemble Cast Award. Then she won the SAFTA Golden Horn award for the Best Supporting Actress - Feature Film category at the SAFTA in 2020.

Apart from that she also performed in numerous theatre plays such as; The Seagull, Uit die Bloutev, Generaal Mannetjies Mentz, King Lear, Uncle Vanya/Oom Wanja, Twaalfde Nag, Begeerte, God of Carnage, Macbeth-Slapeloos, People are Living There, Skuldeisers, The Mother, Fotostaatmasjien and Liewer.

Notable stage dramas

 Fotostaatmasjien (2018)
 The Mother
 Cinderella
 God van Chaos
 Jericho
 Die Twaalfuurwals
 Kamer van Spieëls
 Imbumba Samesyn
 Begeerte
 Twaalfde Nag
 Die Buffel
 Uncle Vanya
 Pendoring
 Steeks
 Wyn
 Generaal Mannetjies Mentz
 King Lear
 Die Laaste Strooi
 Uit die Bloute
 Die Vleiroos
 Moby Dick
 Die Mirakel
 The Seagull
 Die Hekse van Salem
 Sing jy van Bomme
 Keep Moving Ma Jack
 Four Play
 Boo to the Moon
 Women of Troy

Filmography

Awards
 Silver Screen Nomination: Best Supporting Actress ( Poppie Nongena )
 SAFTA Award: Canary
 aArtes Award: Best Actress in Sonkring 2
 FNB Regional Award: Out of the Blue
 FNB Regional Award : The Last Straw
 Prestige Women's Award Report
 Vita Award: Best Supporting Actress for The Witches of Salem
 Avanti Award: Soul City
 SAFTA Award: 7de Laan
 Silver Screen Award: Send Greetings to Males Roux
 Fleur de Cap Award: Best Supporting Actress for Wandering
 SAFTA Golden Horn Award: Best Supporting Actress in 7de Laan

References

External links
 IMDb

Living people
South African film actresses
1963 births